Puma (established 2005 in Trondheim, Norway) is an experimental jazz band.

Biography 
Puma's music is described as energetic and intense, and they have played a variety of concerts internationally and in Norway. They have been held up as one of the greatest talents in the new Norwegian improvised music.

In 2007 Puma began a collaboration with sound artist Lasse Marhaug, for the celebration of Grieg anniversary 07.

Band members 
Stian Westerhus (guitar)
Gard Nilssen (drums)
Øystein Moen (keyboards)

Honors 
2006: Puma was awarded Årets unge jazzmusikere, by Rikskonsertene and Norsk Jazzforum
2006: Finalist in the Young Nordic Jazz Comets, held in Reykjavík on Island

Discography 
2007: Isolationism (Bolage Records)
2008: Discotheque Bitpunching (Bolage Records)
2009: Fist Full of Knuckles (Knuckleman Records), with Lasse Marhaug
2010: Half Nelson Courtship (Rune Grammofon)

References

External links 
Pumajazz – Introvinnere på Oslo Jazzfestival on MIC.no (in Norwegian)

Norwegian electronic music groups
Norwegian post-rock groups
Norwegian jazz ensembles
Norwegian experimental musical groups
Norwegian rock music groups
Rune Grammofon artists
Musical groups established in 2005
Musical groups from Oslo